In the 1995 Honduran Cup the champion was decided after the first nine rounds of the 1995–96 Honduran Liga Nacional, unlike the previous editions where a separate tournament was played. Club Deportivo Olimpia obtained its first title.

Standings

References

Honduran Cup seasons
Cup